Ivan Vladislavovich Sleshinsky or Jan Śleszyński (23 July 1854 – 9 March 1931) was a Polish-Russian mathematician. He was born in Lysianka, Russian Empire to Polish parents.

Life
Śleszyński's main work was on continued fractions, least squares and axiomatic proof theory based on mathematical logic.  He and Alfred Pringsheim, working separately, proved what is now called the Śleszyński–Pringsheim theorem.

His most important publications include: "Teoria dowodu" ("The theory of proof") in two volumes (1925, 1929), and "Teoria wyznaczników" ("The theory of determinants") (1926). He is buried at Rakowicki Cemetery.

See also
 History of philosophy in Poland
 List of Poles

References

External links

1854 births
1931 deaths
19th-century Polish mathematicians
20th-century Russian mathematicians
Burials at Rakowicki Cemetery
Polish mathematicians
Polish logicians
Proof theorists